Syd Saylor (born Leo Sailor; March 24, 1895 – December 21, 1962) was an American comedic actor and movie cowboy sidekick who appeared in 395 films and television series between 1926 and 1962.

Early years
Saylor was born Leo Sailor in 1895 in Chicago. He graduated from the Art Institute of Chicago and worked as an artist before venturing into acting.

Career
In the silent film days of the 1920s, he starred in a series of two-reel comedy shorts, Let George Do It, as the title character. He first appeared in feature-length films in 1926. 

Saylor went on to have a prolific career as a character actor, set apart from other character actors by his  protruding Adam's apple and unique comedic speaking voice. He appeared in everything from comedies to westerns, usually as the hero's comical sidekick. He briefly appeared, sometimes unbilled, in numerous television episodes of Maverick (1957-1962), often with James Garner, always recognizable for his distinctive voice.

Saylor was also the second television "Bozo the Clown" on KTTV Ch. 11 in Hollywood, California during the early 1950s.

Personal life and death

Saylor was married in Chicago in 1920. On September 5, 1941, his wife, Marie, obtained a divorce in Los Angeles. They had a daughter, Jeanne. He died in Hollywood in 1962, aged 67.

Selected filmography

 The Winking Idol (1926) - The Tramp
 The Ridin' Rascal (1926)
 The Runaway Express (1926) - The Tramp
 Red Hot Leather (1926) - 'Noisy' Bates
 The Mystery Rider (1928)
 Just Off Broadway (1929) - Bennie Barnett
 Cat, Dog & Co. (1929, Short) - Pedestrian (uncredited)
 Shanghai Rose (1929) - Xavier Doolittle
 The Border Legion (1930)
 Playthings of Hollywood (1930)
 The Light of Western Stars (1930)
 Men Without Law (1930) - Hank
 No Limit (1931)
 I Take This Woman (1931)
 Law of the Sea (1932)
 Tangled Destinies (1932)
 Lady and Gent (1932) costarring John Wayne
 The Crusader (1932)
 The Nuisance (1933)
 Silent Men (1933)
 Transatlantic Merry-Go-Round (1934)
Marrying Widows  (1934)   
 The Lost Jungle (1934)
 Mystery Mountain (1934)
 The Headline Woman (1935)
 Ladies Crave Excitement (1935)
 Streamline Express (1935)
 The Fighting Coward (1935)
 Wilderness Mail (1935)
 Kelly the Second (1936)
 Prison Shadows (1936)
 The Three Mesquiteers (1936)
 Exiled to Shanghai (1937)
 The Lady Escapes (1937)
 Guns in the Dark (1937) as Oscar
 The Wrong Road (1937)
 Abe Lincoln in Illinois (1940) - John Johnston
 A Gentleman at Heart (1942)
 The Lone Star Ranger (1942)
 That Other Woman (1942)
 Yankee Doodle Dandy (1942) - Star Boarder (uncredited)
 Doughboys in Ireland (1943)
 Tarzan's Desert Mystery (1943)
 Three of a Kind (1944) - Customer
 Ambush Trail (1946) - Sam Hawkins
 Gas House Kids Go West (1947) - Motorcycle Cop (uncredited)
 The Arkansas Swing (1948) - Sheriff Dibble
 High Noon (1952) - Old Timer on Hotel Porch (uncredited)
 The Hawk of Wild River (1952) - Yank'em Out Kennedy
 Toughest Man Alive (1955) - Proprieter
 The Crawling Hand (1963) - Soda Shop Keeper (posthumous release)

References

External links

1895 births
1962 deaths
American male film actors
Male actors from Chicago
20th-century American male actors
Male Western (genre) film actors